The 2000 Florida State Seminoles football team represented Florida State University in the 2000 NCAA Division I-A football season. The team was coached by Bobby Bowden and played their home games at Doak Campbell Stadium.  The Seminoles reached the title game for the third straight year and quarterback Chris Weinke won the school's second Heisman Trophy.

Regular season
As a senior in 2000, Chris Weinke led the nation in passing with 4,167 yards and won the Heisman Trophy, awarded to college football's best player, as well as the Davey O'Brien Award and the Johnny Unitas Award. He also led the Seminoles to the Orange Bowl for their third title game in as many years, where they lost 13–2 to the Oklahoma Sooners. At the age of 28, Weinke was the oldest player in history to win the Heisman Trophy. He finished his Florida State career with a 32–3 record and held numerous FSU records including most passing yards in a career and most career touchdown passes.

Schedule

Roster

Rankings

2000 team members in the NFL

Awards and honors
Chris Weinke, Heisman Trophy 
Chris Weinke, Sammy Baugh Trophy 
Chris Weinke, Davey O'Brien Award  
Chris Weinke, Johnny Unitas Golden Arm Award  
Jamal Reynolds, Defensive End, Lombardi Award

References

Florida State
Florida State Seminoles football seasons
Atlantic Coast Conference football champion seasons
Florida State Seminoles football